Khalid al-Masri (other transcriptions: , , Khaled, El-Masri  ) is the name of a person alleged to have approached two 9/11 hijackers on a train in Germany and suggested that they contact an alleged al Qaeda operative in Duisburg.

The 9/11 Commission Report stated:

However, in response to Slahi's petition for a writ of habeas corpus, a U.S. District Court found only that Slahi "provided lodging for three men for one night at his home in Germany [in November 1999], that one of them was Ramzi bin al-Shibh, and that there was discussion of jihad and Afghanistan".

An unrelated German citizen, Khalid El-Masri, spent almost five months in the covert CIA prison in Afghanistan called the Salt Pit in the early months of 2004, where he was interrogated and tortured. Alfreda Frances Bikowsky ordered El-Masri to be extraordinarily rendered, even though she only had a hunch El-Masri was the same person as al-Masri.

References

Living people
Al-Qaeda members
Hamburg cell
Year of birth missing (living people)